Eric J. Evans  (2 July 1945 – 27 March 2022) was a British historian who was Professor Emeritus of History at the University of Lancaster and was Chair (1991–98) and vice-president (since 1998) of the Social History Society.

Education
His first degree (BA) was from the University of Oxford (1966) and his PhD was from the University of Warwick (1970). His specialist research interests included: British political history since the eighteenth century; the history of social policy; how social change affects the political process; British national identities.

Career
His academic career began as a Lecturer at the University of Stirling (1969–71). He had been at Lancaster University since 1971, being successively Lecturer, Senior Lecturer and Reader. He became Professor of Social History in 1985 and served as Dean of the university's Faculty of Arts and Social Science (2004–5). He was an office-holder of the Social History Society from its inception in 1976 to 1998, serving as the Society's Chairman (1991–98) and Honorary Vice-president (from 1998).

More recent publications included The Shaping of Modern Britain, 1780–1914 (Pearson Longman, 2011), Sir Robert Peel, Statesmanship Power and Party (2nd ed., 2006) and The Forging of the Modern State: Early Industrial Britain 1783–1870 (3rd ed., Longman, 2001). He was also interested in curriculum development and assessment. He was Chief Examiner and Chair of Examiners in History for each of the three major English GCSE and A-level Awarding Bodies. He was Chair of the History Postgraduate Awards Panel of the Arts and Humanities Research Board from 2000 to 2005.

He was elected a Centenary Fellow of the UK Historical Association in 2006. He was also a Fellow of the Royal Historical Society and the Royal Society of Arts. He was awarded a National Teaching Fellowship by the Higher Education Academy in 2004. His hobbies included music and cricket.

Publications

References

External links
Lancaster University Portal Obituary

Academics of Lancaster University
1945 births
Living people
Alumni of the University of Oxford
Alumni of the University of Warwick
Academics of the University of Stirling
Fellows of the Royal Historical Society